El Salvador sent 274 athletes (151 males, 123 females) to the XXIst Central American and Caribbean Games in Mayagüez, Puerto Rico, July 17 - August 1, 2010.

The athletes participated in: Archery (12), Athletics (8), Badminton (2), Beach Volleyball (4), Bowling (9), Boxing (4), Cycling (13), Equestrian (6), Football (soccer) (34), Fencing (22), Gymnastics (8), Handball (28), Judo (11), Karate Do (11), Roller Speed (7), Rowing (12), Sailing (7), Shooting (12), Softball (16), Squash (6), Swimming (5), Table Tennis (8), Taekwondo (8), Tennis (2), Triathlon (1), Weightlifting (9) and Wrestling (9).

Medalists

Gold

Silver

Bronze
Juan A. Guerra Quiñonez - Swimming (men's 200 breast)
Pamela Benítez - Swimming (women's 200 free)
Pamela Benítez - Swimming (women's 400 free)
Pamela Benítez - Swimming (women's 800 free)

Results by event

Archery

Athletics

Badminton

Beach Volleyball

Bowling

Boxing

Cycling

Mountain

Road

Track

Equestrian

Football

Fencing

Gymnastics

Artistic

Rhythmic

Handball

Judo

Karate Do

Roller Speed

Rowing

Sailing

Shooting

Softball

Squash

Swimming

Rafael Alfaro (m)
Pamela Benítez (f)
Gabriel Díaz León (m)
Juan A. Guerra Quiñonez (m)
Sergio R. Melendez Navas (m)

Table Tennis

Taekwondo

Tennis

Triathlon

Weightlifting

Wrestling

References

External links

Nations at the 2010 Central American and Caribbean Games
2010
Central American and Caribbean Games